Thatcher is an unincorporated community in Franklin County, Idaho, United States.  Its elevation is 4,902 feet (1,494 m), and it is located at  (42.4088106, -111.7268930).  Although Thatcher is unincorporated, it has a post office, with the ZIP code of 83283; the ZCTA for ZIP Code 83283 had a population of 123 at the 2000 census.

References

External links

Unincorporated communities in Franklin County, Idaho
Unincorporated communities in Idaho